Armand LeBlanc (September 5, 1921 – October 3, 2004) was an American politician from Maine. LeBlanc, a Democrat, served in the Maine House of Representatives from 1973 to July 31, 1977, when he resigned. He was a resident of Van Buren, Maine.

References

1921 births
2004 deaths
People from Van Buren, Maine
Democratic Party members of the Maine House of Representatives
20th-century American politicians